Ahmed Ahmed, (born June 27, 1970) is an Egyptian-American actor and comedian.

Early life
Ahmed Ahmed was born in Helwan, Egypt. His family moved to the United States when he was one month old and he grew up in Riverside, California.

Career
Ahmed Ahmed moved to Hollywood when he was 19 years old to pursue a career as an actor and stand-up comedian, and he has been working there ever since.

He has appeared in several films and television shows such as Executive Decision, Swingers, Tracey Takes On..., Roseanne, JAG, Tough Crowd with Colin Quinn on Comedy Central, and MTV's Punk'd with Ashton Kutcher. He would later joke about his part in Executive Decision in his standup routine for the Axis of Evil Comedy Tour. He has also appeared on CNN, The View, and National Public Radio,  and was featured on the front page of The Wall Street Journal in December 2001, as well as in Newsweek. He was featured in the PBS television documentary America at a Crossroads series in "STAND UP: Muslim American Comics Come of Age", an episode about Muslim American comedians.

Ahmed Ahmed is a regular performer at The Comedy Store in Hollywood and tours all across the US and Europe. He was the winner of the first annual Richard Pryor Award for ethnic comedy at the Edinburgh Festival in Scotland in the summer of 2004. Ahmed was a member of the Axis of Evil Comedy Tour. He was also a notable guest for Axis of Justice which is a rock and heavy metal concert which fights for social justice.

He had a regular role in the TBS sitcom Sullivan & Son.

In 2019, Ahmed received media attention after an audience member called 911 in response to his stand-up set.

Personal life
Ahmed says his role models include his parents, Muhammad Ali, Mitzi Shore, and friend Vince Vaughn.

Following 9/11, and through 2004, Ahmed Ahmed and the comedian Rabbi Bob Alper toured the United States with their avant-grade show "One Arab, One Jew, One Stage" about interfaith harmony and essential human dignity.

Filmography

Film

Television

References

External links 

Official Website

Time magazine article about Ahmed Ahmed and his comedy act
BBC article on Ahmed Ahmed as winner of Richard Pryor award
Ahmed Ahmed featured in the Cultural Connect
Ahmed Ahmed talking about Middle East travels and troubles on podcast

1970 births
Living people
American male comedians
American male film actors
American male television actors
American Muslims
American stand-up comedians
Comedians from California
Egyptian emigrants to the United States
Male actors from Cairo
Male actors from Riverside, California
Muslim male comedians
20th-century American comedians
21st-century American comedians